This is a list of African-American newspapers that have been published in the state of California, including both historical and contemporary publications. California's first such newspaper was the Mirror of the Times, which began publishing in the mid-1850s. Although the number of African Americans in California did not exceed 1,100 until the 20th-century, seven African-American newspapers were established in the San Francisco Bay Area in the 19th century.

Northern California 

The Northern California region takes up the northern two-thirds of the state, including the Central Valley and San Francisco Bay Area.

Southern California 

The Southern California region takes up the southern third of the state, and includes the Los Angeles metropolitan area, San Diego, and the Inland Empire region.

See also

List of African-American newspapers and media outlets
List of African-American newspapers in Arizona
List of African-American newspapers in Nevada
List of African-American newspapers in Oregon
List of newspapers in California

Works cited

References

Newspapers
California
African-American
African-American newspapers